Lionel Sebastián Scaloni (born 16 May 1978) is an Argentine professional football manager and former player who currently coaches the Argentina national team. A versatile player, he operated as a right-back or right midfielder.

Born in Pujato, Santa Fe, Scaloni debuted as a player for Newell's Old Boys in 1995. He spent most of his professional career in Spain, mainly at Deportivo de La Coruña, with whom he won the 1999–2000 Spanish league title and the 2001–02 Copa del Rey; in total, he amassed 258 games and 15 goals over 12 seasons in La Liga with three different teams. He also played for several years in Italy, with Lazio and Atalanta, before retiring in 2015. Internationally, he played for Argentina at under-20 level, and made his debut for the senior team in 2003; he won seven caps for the team between 2003 and 2006, and was part of their 2006 World Cup squad.

Scaloni became a manager in 2016, starting as an assistant at Sevilla and Argentina's under-20 team. In 2018, he was named the outright manager of the under-20 team, and was chosen to lead the Argentina senior team later that year. With the senior team, he guided them to third place at his first international tournament, the 2019 Copa América, in Brazil. He won the 2021 edition, Argentina's first such honour in 28 years, and then beat Italy in the 2022 Finalissima. Thereafter, the Scaloni-led national team won their third World Cup title, the first since 1986, in 2022 in Qatar.

Playing career

Club

Early years and Deportivo 

Born in the small town of Pujato in Santa Fe Province, with Italian origins from Ascoli Piceno, Marche, Scaloni began his career in the Argentine Primera División with local club Newell's Old Boys and then Estudiantes de La Plata, before joining Spain's Deportivo de La Coruña in December 1997 for 405 million pesetas.

Regularly used with the Galicians over an eight-and-a-half-year stint, he competed with Manuel Pablo and Víctor for both starting spots on the right flank. Due to a knee injury, he appeared in only 14 La Liga matches as Depor won the title for the first time.

After falling out with manager Joaquín Caparrós, Scaloni joined Premier League side West Ham United on loan on 31 January 2006, the final day of the transfer window, in an attempt to increase his chance of selection for the upcoming World Cup. He took the number 2 shirt from the departed Tomáš Řepka, and made his league debut for the East Londoners against Sunderland, on 4 February; he also helped the team to reach the FA Cup final, a penalty shootout loss to Liverpool.

Racing Santander 

Scaloni left West Ham after a permanent move could not be agreed. Deportivo released him on 1 September 2006 alongside Diego Tristán, one day after the close of the summer transfer window.

However, due to the fact there were no limitations for free agents, two weeks later Scaloni signed a one-year contract at Racing de Santander, The Cantabrians subsequently finished in mid table. He appeared – and started – in both games against his former club, both ending in 0–0 draws.

Italy 
On 30 June 2007, Scaloni moved to S.S. Lazio in Italy's Serie A on a five-year deal. In January of the following year he returned to Spain, on loan to RCD Mallorca for 18 months; subsequently, he returned to Rome, where he was rarely used for the following three seasons.

At age 35, Scaloni joined Atalanta B.C. in January 2013. He was released at the end of the campaign, but re-signed after failing to find a new club.

International 

After making his debut for Argentina on 30 April 2003 in a friendly game with Libya, Scaloni was a surprise selection for the 2006 FIFA World Cup, taking the place of veteran Javier Zanetti who also played as a right wing-back. His only appearance of the tournament was the 2–1 extra time win against Mexico in the round of 16, on 24 June 2006 at the Zentralstadion, which he started and finished.

Coaching career

Assistant 
On 11 October 2016, Scaloni joined compatriot Jorge Sampaoli's coaching staff at Sevilla FC. The following June, when the latter was appointed as the new national team boss, he was again named his assistant.

Argentina
After Argentina's failure at the World Cup in Russia, Scaloni and Pablo Aimar were named caretaker managers until the end of the year. In November 2018, the former was confirmed in the post until the following June when the 2019 Copa América was due to take place, despite widespread opposition against him at the time. He led the side to third place in Brazil.

Scaloni led Argentina to the 2021 Copa América title after defeating Brazil who were once again the hosts (1–0), helping them to win their first trophy in 28 years. In November that year, he was nominated for The Best FIFA Football Coach Award, but did not make the final three shortlist.

On 1 June 2022, Scaloni's Argentina won the 2022 Finalissima after defeating European champions Italy 3–0 at Wembley Stadium. On 16 November, Argentina beat the United Arab Emirates 5–0 in a friendly World Cup warm-up game ahead of the World Cup extending their unbeaten run to 36 matches, just one shy of Italy's record of 37.

On 22 November, Scaloni's side lost 2–1 to Saudi Arabia in their opening group stage match of the World Cup in Qatar ending their unbeaten run of 36 matches; the result was considered by Gracenote statistically the greatest upset in the history of the tournament. Nevertheless, they made it into the knockout stages after recording wins over Mexico (2–0) and Poland (also 2–0). Argentina then overcame Australia (2–1) in the round of 16, and advanced over the  Netherlands in the quarter-finals with a penalty shoot-out victory, following which Scaloni defended his team after controversy surrounding the fights and tension between Argentine and Dutch players during the ill-tempered shoot-out. After beating Croatia 3–0 in the semi-finals, the nation reached the final for the second time in eight years. He then led Argentina to their third FIFA World Cup title in the final against France, with the Argentine team winning via a 4–2 penalty shoot-out after the match had ended in 3–3 after extra time. The triumph meant Lionel Scaloni has become the youngest manager since 1978, and the fourth youngest manager to win the World Cup, which, coincidentally, were both achieved by Argentine compatriot César Luis Menotti. Scaloni was recognised as the best men's national coach in the world in 2022 by the International Federation of Football History & Statistics (IFFHS).

Personal life 
Scaloni's older brother, Mauro, also played at Deportivo, but never made it beyond its reserve team. He and his wife Elisa Montero have two sons, Ian and Noah.

In April 2019, Scaloni was run over while cycling in Calvià in Majorca. Some media initially reported him to be in serious condition, but he was discharged a few hours later.

Career statistics

International

Managerial statistics

Honours

Player 
Deportivo La Coruña
 La Liga: 1999–2000
 Copa del Rey: 2001–02
 Supercopa de España: 2000, 2002

West Ham United
 FA Cup runner-up: 2005–06

Argentina
 FIFA World Youth Championship: 1997

Manager 
Argentina
 FIFA World Cup: 2022
 Copa América: 2021; third place: 2019
 CONMEBOL–UEFA Cup of Champions: 2022
Individual
 IFFHS Men's World's Best National Coach: 2022

 The Best FIFA Men's Coach: 2022

See also 
 List of Argentina national football team managers

References

External links 

 

1978 births
Living people
Argentine people of Italian descent
Argentine footballers
Footballers from Santa Fe, Argentina
Association football defenders
Association football midfielders
Argentine Primera División players
Newell's Old Boys footballers
Estudiantes de La Plata footballers
La Liga players
Deportivo de La Coruña players
Racing de Santander players
RCD Mallorca players
Premier League players
West Ham United F.C. players
Serie A players
S.S. Lazio players
Atalanta B.C. players
FA Cup Final players
Argentina under-20 international footballers
Argentina international footballers
2006 FIFA World Cup players
Argentine expatriate footballers
Expatriate footballers in Spain
Expatriate footballers in England
Expatriate footballers in Italy
Argentine expatriate sportspeople in Spain
Argentine expatriate sportspeople in England
Argentine expatriate sportspeople in Italy
Argentine football managers
Argentina national under-20 football team managers
Argentina national football team managers
2019 Copa América managers
2021 Copa América managers
2022 FIFA World Cup managers
FIFA World Cup-winning managers